Captain Fracasse (French:Le capitaine Fracasse) is a 1929 French silent adventure film directed by Alberto Cavalcanti and Henry Wulschleger and starring Pierre Blanchar, Lien Deyers and Charles Boyer. It is based on the 1863 novel of the same name by Théophile Gautier.

The film's sets were designed by the art director Erik Aaes.

Cast
 Pierre Blanchar as Baron de Sigognac / Le capitaine Fracasse  
 Lien Deyers as Isabelle  
 Charles Boyer as Duc de Vallombreuse 
 Daniel Mendaille as Agostin  
 Pola Illéry as Chiquita  
 Marie-Thérèse Vincent as Séraphine 
 Odette Josylla as Zerbine  
 Marguerite Moreno as Dame Léonarde  
 Armand Numès as Blazius  
 Paul Quevedo as Leander 
 Paul Velsa as Matamore  
 René Bergeron as Scapín  
 Léon Courtois as Herode 
 Georges Benoît 
 Clairette de Savoye
 Alexandre Vargas

References

Bibliography 
 Klossner, Michael. The Europe of 1500-1815 on Film and Television: A Worldwide Filmography of Over 2550 Works, 1895 Through 2000. McFarland & Company, 2002.

External links 
 

1929 films
1920s historical adventure films
French historical adventure films
French silent feature films
1920s French-language films
Films directed by Henry Wulschleger
Films directed by Alberto Cavalcanti
Films set in the 17th century
French black-and-white films
Films based on Captain Fracasse
Silent historical adventure films
1920s French films